Demon lord or Demon Lord may refer to:

 Demon lord (Dungeons & Dragons), a type of monster in the role-playing game Dungeons & Dragons
 Demon Lord Dante, a manga by Go Nagai
 Demon Lord of Karanda, a 1988 David Eddings novel
 Demon Lord, Retry!, a 2017 light novel and manga adapted into an anime television series in 2019
 Lord Demon, a 1999 Roger Zelazny novel
 Shin Hae-chul (1968–2014), a K-pop star who was nicknamed "Demon Lord"

See also 
 Dark Lord (disambiguation)
 Demon King (disambiguation)